Owusu Agyekum (born 29 November 1942) is a Ghanaian politician and a member of the First Parliament of the fourth Republic representing the Birim North constituency in Eastern Region of Ghana.

Early life and education 
Agyekum was born on 29 November 1942 at Birim North in the Eastern Region of Ghana. He attended the London Institute of Neurology, Moscow First Medical School land the Moscow Institute of Tropical Medicine and he studied Medicine and obtained his Doctor of Philosophy, Medical Degree and his CSIM respectively.

Career 
Agyekum is a physician by profession.

Politics 
Agyekum was first elected into Parliament on the ticket of the National Convention Party for the Yilo Krobo Constituency in the Eastern Region of Ghana during the 1992 Ghanaian parliamentary election. He was defeated in the by Kweku Boateng-Lovinger of the National Democratic Congress who polled 20,737 votes out of the 100% valid votes cast representing 36.00% over his oppositions Owusu Agyekum of the Convention People's Party who polled 12,139 votes representing 21.10%, Victor Biscoff Owusu Ahinkorah of the New Patriotic Party who polled 11,306 votes representing 19.60%, Agyenim Boateng who polled 448 votes representing 0.80% and Alex Oduro-Ampadu who polled 0 vote representing 0.00%.

Personal life 
Agyekum is a Christian.

References 

Living people
1942 births
Ghanaian MPs 1993–1997
National Convention Party (Ghana) politicians
People from Eastern Region (Ghana)
Ghanaian medical doctors